Minnesota State Highway 257 (MN 257) is a  highway in southwest Minnesota, which runs from its intersection with Brown County State-Aid Highway 20 (Broadway Avenue) in the city of Hanska and continues east to its eastern terminus at its intersection with State Highway 15 in Linden Township, 6 miles north of Madelia.

Route description
Highway 257 serves as a short east–west connector route in southwest Minnesota between the city of Hanska and State Highway 15.

It passes around the north side of Linden Lake in Linden Township.

The route is legally defined as Route 257 in the Minnesota Statutes.

History
Highway 257 was authorized on July 1, 1949.

The route was paved in 1950.

Major intersections

References

External links

Highway 257 at the Unofficial Minnesota Highways Page

257
Transportation in Brown County, Minnesota